The men's 25 metre center-fire pistol team competition at the 2002 Asian Games in Busan, South Korea was held on 7 October at the Changwon International Shooting Range.

Schedule
All times are Korea Standard Time (UTC+09:00)

Records

Results

References 

2002 Asian Games Report, Page 639–641
Results

External links
Official website

Men Pistol 25 C T